Erich Salomon (28 April 1886 – 7 July 1944) was a German Jewish news photographer known for his pictures in the diplomatic and legal professions and the innovative methods he used to acquire them.

Life and work
Born in Berlin, as the son of the wealthy Jewish banker and Royal Councillor of Commerce Emil Salomon (1844–1909) and Therese Salomon née Schüler (1857–1915). The upper-class Berlin family lived at Jägerstraße 29 and later at Tiergartenstraße 15 (today the State Representation of Baden-Württemberg is located here).Salomon studied law, engineering, and zoology up to World War I. He served on the Western Front and was captured by the French in 1914.  After the war, he worked in the promotion department of the Ullstein publishing empire designing their billboard advertisements. He first picked up a camera in 1927, when he was 41, to document some legal disputes and soon after hid an Ermanox camera usable in dim light in his bowler hat. By cutting a hole in the hat for the lens, Salomon snapped a photo of a police killer on trial in a Berlin criminal court.

Beginning in 1928, Salomon worked for Ullstein's Berliner Illustrirte Zeitung as a photographer. With his multilingual ability and clever concealment, his reputation soared among the people of Europe. When the Kellogg-Briand Pact was signed in 1928, Salomon walked into the signing room and took the vacant seat of the Polish delegate, and took several photos. He is one of only two known persons to have photographed a session of the U.S. Supreme Court.

After Adolf Hitler came to power in Germany, Salomon fled to the Netherlands with his wife and continued his photographic career in The Hague. Salomon declined an invitation from Life magazine to move to the United States. He and his family were trapped in the Low Countries after Germany invaded in 1940. Salomon and his family were held in the Westerbork transit camp, then for almost five months in Theresienstadt concentration camp and were deported from there to the Theresienstadt family camp in May 1944. He died in Auschwitz on 7 July 1944.

The Dr. Erich Salomon Award is a lifetime achievement award for photojournalists given by the German society for photography.

In 1978 Salomon was inducted into the International Photography Hall of Fame and Museum.

Photos by Salomon
Summit Conference (1928; depicts foreign ministers of France, Germany, Britain, Poland, Japan, and Italy just before they signed the Kellogg-Briand Pact)

References

 Erich Salomon, photographer – biography by Peter Hunter (Salomon) 
 Photo Gallery 
 the Ermanox (the camera Erich Salomon used)

Further reading
 Helmut Gernsheim. "Dr Erich Salomon 1886–1944: Historian with a Camera". Creative Camera. January 1972. Repr. in: David Brittain, ed. Creative Camera: 30 Years of Writing, Critical Image. Manchester: Manchester University, 1999, . pp. 46–52.

1886 births
1944 deaths
German photojournalists
Portrait photographers
Westerbork transit camp survivors
German people who died in Auschwitz concentration camp
Theresienstadt Ghetto prisoners
Photographers from Berlin
Jewish emigrants from Nazi Germany to the Netherlands
German Jews who died in the Holocaust